Milecastle 11 (Throckley Bank Top) was a milecastle of the Roman Hadrian's Wall.  No remains exist, but the measured position is the middle of the old village of Throckley Bank Top, under the Working Men's Club.

Construction 
Nothing is known of the construction of Milecastle 11.

Excavations and investigations
1858 – Henry MacLauchlan surveyed the area, and discovered what he assumed to be the milecastle.

1879 – A coin hoard of over 5000 silvered coins (dated 244 AD to 275 AD) in a pot was discovered at a point slightly north of the currently assumed milecastle position (just behind the wall).

1928 – Maclauchlan's find is identified as an old pit heap. Trenching in the measured site of the milecastle is unsuccessful.
1929 – Further unsuccessful investigation.
1959 – Further unsuccessful trenches by Miss Phillips in the area of demolished miners' cottages.

1990 – English Heritage's Central Excavation Unit observed a 0.5 m deep cable trench cut through the site, without result.
2002 – A metalled surface on two levels was discovered slightly north of the presumed milecastle position. From a point just east of the milecastle, as far as Turret 11B, 145 pits were discovered along the berm.  Some retained the impression of two upright stakes.

Associated turrets 
Each milecastle on Hadrian's Wall had two associated turret structures.  These turrets were positioned approximately one-third and two-thirds of a Roman mile to the west of the Milecastle, and would probably have been manned by part of the milecastle's garrison.  The turrets associated with Milecastle 11 are known as Turret 11A and Turret 11B.

Turret 11A
Investigation in 1928 failed to find Turret 11A (Heddon Hall).

Presumed location:

Turret 11B
Turret 11B (Great Hill) was located just to the east of the summit of Great Hill.  No masonry remains, but the location was confirmed in 1919 by the discovery of pottery and occupation earth.

Location on Ordnance Survey 1:25 000 map:

Monument records

References

Bibliography

11